While studies have shown the effects of solitary confinement to be detrimental to some inmates, solitary confinement of women has particular consequences for women that may differ from the way it affects men. Solitary confinement rates for women in the United States are roughly comparable to those for men and about 20% of prisoners will be in solitary confinement at some point during their prison career.

Incidence 
According to the Bureau of Justice Statistics’ report from 2011-2012, about 20% of female prison inmates and 17% of female jail inmates spent some time in solitary confinement during that year, numbers which are comparable to rates for men.

Solitary confinement is allegedly used to prevent violence within the prison population, and is becoming more common due to the prison industrial complex and the rise in incarceration rates. In most prisons, inmates that are put into solitary confinement fall into one of three categories: disciplinary segregation, voluntary administrative segregation, and involuntary administrative segregation. Disciplinary segregation is used as a punishment, while administrative segregation is a preventative measure intended to protect either the inmate being isolated or the other inmates. While segregation as a disciplinary measure or a precaution that protects other inmates is allegedly reserved for offenders who have committed violent acts while in prison, women in particular are often put into solitary for much smaller offenses, such as throwing things or talking back to guards. It is also often used against women who complain of sexual assault from prison guards or other inmates. Once they are in solitary confinement, women are often monitored more closely and disciplined more harshly than men are.

Disciplinary segregation 
An offender who has committed a “serious disciplinary offense” may be put in solitary confinement as a punitive measure. Inmates put into disciplinary segregation are not required to be given the same privileges as those put into administrative segregation, but the duration of their stay in isolation tends to be shorter. According to a magazine written by inmates in a California prison, the practice operates under a “guilty until proven innocent” protocol, holding prisoners in solitary confinement even before it is clear that they committed the infraction.

Inmates who are considered to be politically threatening are sometimes put into isolation; although the United States does not officially hold political prisoners, some inmates in solitary confinement are there because of their political activism. This justification often means that minorities are more likely to end up in solitary confinement.

Administrative segregation 
Administrative segregation, or “ad seg," is typically more common than disciplinary segregation, and serves to protect either the inmate being placed in solitary or others in the prison. An offender may be put into administrative segregation if they are thought to be dangerous to others or if their own safety is in danger, or if “the inmate has the potential to interfere with an ongoing investigation." Often women who vocalize the fact that they feel threatened by someone else will be put into solitary confinement, and similarly, if they are accused of acting threatening in any way, they are put into solitary without being able to defend themselves. Women who are put into administrative segregation tend to be those women who have had trouble adjusting to prison life and who are seen as “high-risk” and “high-needs” when they enter the prison. Because this type of segregation is not intended as punishment, inmates in administrative segregation are legally required to be treated in the same way as those in general confinement in prison.

Voluntary 
Women prisoners sometimes request to be put into solitary confinement, most often for their own protection. Specifically, some women are thought to request solitary confinement to avoid “further assaults on their identity” that might arise from their interactions and experiences in prison. Studies have found that women who have been in voluntary administrative segregation tend to have high personal or emotional needs, and some have struggled with substance abuse, although few have difficulty with “community functioning.”

Involuntary 
Women prisoners who are deemed to be dangerous to other prisoners are sometimes put into administrative segregation; a prisoner can also be put in segregation if the officers determine that she herself is in danger and needs this protection. Like women who are voluntarily put into segregation, these women tend to have high personal and emotional needs, but many of them also have difficulties functioning in the community or associating with other people.

Women put in segregation 
In general, women tend to be subjected to harsher disciplinary practices in prisons than men. In the case of solitary confinement, women are often put into segregation for committing small errors while in prison, for example spitting at a guard, while men must commit more violent infractions, such as attacking a guard, for segregation to become necessary. This could arise from the fact that women in prison are held to especially high standards of femininity, and prisons encourage them to conform to very traditional ideas of being a woman. This model of femininity requires women to be “pure, passive, heterosexual, and located in motherhood." When women do not comply with this standard while imprisoned, they are punished further. In fact, some prisons specifically isolate women who seem “butch” or not traditionally feminine.

Another catalyst for being put into solitary confinement that applies overwhelmingly to women is that prisoners who complain of abusive treatment by guards are often segregated as retaliation. In particular, women who speak out after guards have sexually harassed them are often put into segregation. Not only does this mean that guards who are guilty of sexually harassing inmates go unpunished, it also decreases the likelihood that women will report harassment.

In some prisons, women may be put into solitary confinement because their mental health issues prove to be too difficult for the authorities to deal with or are exhausting their resources. If the prison authorities are unable to address their inmates’ health concerns, they may put them into solitary confinement to avoid solving the problem. This means that the women in solitary confinement are often already at risk for mental health or other challenges, due to previous health concerns or sexual abuse.

Consequences for women 
Solitary confinement has been shown to be detrimental to the mental and physical well-being of all inmates, but there are some ways in which being put into segregation can be more harmful for women than for men. This is often due to patriarchal structures that exist outside of the prison environment as well. They “experience segregation as women”; they are both subjected to slightly different treatment than men are and their perception of this treatment may differ as well.

Psychological effects 
Being put into solitary confinement can be very damaging to the mental health of female inmates, particularly those with a history of mental or physical illness, as has been found in a number of studies that observed and interviewed women who were being held in solitary confinement. Being held in a small space without access to objects, recreation, or human contact can lead to claustrophobia, anger, depression, hallucinations, insomnia, and obsessive ideation or fixation on dying. On a psychosomatic level, inmates in solitary confinement often experience a loss of appetite and/or weight, dizziness, or heart palpitations. Prison staff often do not respond adequately to complaints of any of these symptoms, and sometimes refuse to offer medical care or medication.

Some of the anxiety that inmates, particularly female inmates, experience in solitary confinement comes from a loss or confusion of identity. Prisoners in solitary confinement are not allowed to decorate the small rooms that they are in or to bring most of their possessions that they were allowed in general confinement. This prevents the women from having any sort of entertainment, but also exacerbates feelings of a loss of individuality and of personal identity.

Studies of the conditions of segregation, and interviews with the women who are subjected to them, have shown that women may also experience a collapse or confusion of identity while in prison because of their removal from their community and because of the unusual experience of space and time while in solitary confinement. Prisoners attach a lot of importance to the items that they have in their rooms; when they are placed into solitary confinement and no longer allowed to keep these identifying objects with them, they begin to lose their sense of self. Further, because prisoners kept in segregation often interact little with the outside world, and because the routines of eating and cleaning may be different from in general confinement, the women lose their ability to mark time. The Fire Inside magazine, written by offenders in California women's prisons, quotes one prisoner as saying that her recommendation for those held in solitary confinement is “to create a schedule” and figure out the time of day, because it “helps to assert control over your own life and not be totally defined by whatever ‘routine’ the prison is forcing on you.”

Another aspect of their identity that is destroyed is their ability to form relationships with others. In most societies, women are perceived as being particularly social; having relationships with other people is seen as an essential element of their role as women in particular. This is of course impossible when in solitary confinement. It has been argued that this has a harmful effect on women especially. These conclusions were drawn from interviews with women who were still in solitary confinement, women who had been in solitary but had since been transferred back to the general prison population, and women who had been in solitary but had been released from incarceration, suggesting that these effects carry over beyond their time in segregation.

Some prisons do allow inmates in solitary confinement to use recreation rooms and exercise yards, but these are often monitored by cameras, creating a sense of powerlessness and humiliating and deterring the women from using these facilities. Feelings of powerlessness or hopeless are exacerbated by the fact that women are often unsure of how long they will be held in solitary confinement.

All of these factors combined can have different effects on women, making them either increasingly anxious or increasingly indifferent. While some women feel desperate and angry, others attempt to feel as little as possible in order to mitigate the effects of segregation. Because of the detrimental effect on their mental stability, inmates in solitary confinement often resort to self-harm; this behavior is more common in women than in men. This can sometimes lead to women being held in solitary confinement for longer, as punishment for their destructive actions. Similarly, it reinforces the guards’ perceptions of these women as particularly violent or dangerous to the rest of the prison community.

Sexual abuse 

Women in solitary confinement are often watched over by male guards, which can result in sexual harassment ranging from discomfort caused by guards watching them during private moments to non consensual sexual contact. Male guards often are present while women shower or undress. Because women in solitary confinement experience so little human contact, the gaze of their guards is often the only interaction that they have with another person; this can exacerbate the feelings of loss of privacy.

Similarly, the clothing the women are required to wear is sexualized and humiliating. In some prisons, women in segregation wear a "baby doll," a long shapeless dress, with no underclothes. Although men sometimes are required to wear the “baby doll” as well, women find that wearing it while being watched by their male guards is degrading and makes them feel powerless.

Beyond this, women in segregation are sometimes subjected to sexual abuse or physical harassment by their male guards. They are often forced to undergo thorough strip searches, during which the guards are more forceful and invasive than is strictly necessary and serves mostly to demonstrate the guards’ authority over the inmates. Because so many female inmates have been victims of sexual or physical abuse, this forces them to relive the trauma of their previous abuse. This can be especially devastating for women whose mental states are already deteriorating, due to prior mental illness or to the effects of being in segregation. It can also result in pregnancy, and pregnant women in solitary confinement—whether the pregnancy was a result of a rape by a guard or not—are often denied proper medical care.

Women have also reported stories of being publicly humiliated when asking for additional sanitary pads during their menstrual periods, or being forced to hand in their used pads in order to acquire a new one, according to the women who contributed to The Fire Inside magazine. They are entirely dependent on male guards, even for such personal needs as this.

Separation from children 
Women are more likely than men to be the primary guardian of a child or children; having a mother who is in solitary confinement, then, can be very detrimental to the children. Inmates in solitary confinement have much less frequent contact with family members, and when they do, they are usually separated by a partition. Although inmates are allowed some visits from immediate family members, a long background check is required. Children with mothers in prison are at a greater risk for depression or anxiety, substance abuse, or involvement in crime. These factors are only furthered by the more distanced relationship that becomes necessary with a mother in solitary confinement and the restrictions on visitation that accompany that.

Reentry 

Women who are released from solitary confinement into the general prison population are more likely than men to experience stigmatization and humiliation from the prison guards. This often leads to them isolating themselves and not interacting with other prisoners even when they are not in solitary confinement.

Once they are released from prison, too, they often have a harder time adjusting to being a part of society again, and frequently end up back in prison. Ex-offenders who were held in solitary confinement are more likely to commit violent acts against others once released than those who spent all their time in the general prison population. As one California prisoner who wrote for The Fire Inside prison magazine put it, “We go through these kind of mental, emotional, and spiritual stages. At first when you get here you’re angry and disoriented…Paranoia sets in…I slowly began to think of this cell as my safe place…What happens next year when they take the box away?” She, and other women in solitary confinement, become unequipped to deal with the outside world and the knowledge of technological advancement, social interaction skills, and mental stability that it requires.

Women of color in solitary confinement 
In general, women of color, like men of color, are more likely to be put in prison than white women and men. Likewise, they are thought to be somewhat disproportionately represented in the solitary confinement population. The Bureau of Justice Statistics reports that in 2011–2012, 16% of white prison inmates, 20% of black/African American prison inmates, 16% of Hispanic or Latino prison inmates, and 20% of prison with some other racial identification were in solitary confinement at some point. The difference was slightly less pronounced in jails, with 17% of white, 17% of black/African American, 15% of Hispanic/Latino, and 21% of other inmates spending time in solitary confinement. There is no data available that specifically documents the intersection between race and gender.

Although the number of people of color in isolation is only slightly higher than the number of white people, their experiences in solitary confinement may differ. Women in solitary confinement are treated as less than human, in ways which parallel not only the larger societal degradation of women but also that of people of color. The sexually abusive nature of their interactions with the guards, and the denial of medical care, social contact, and resources, can be seen as racialized. In particular, guards often refer to women in solitary confinement using slurs that are both misogynist and racist.

Women who are put into solitary confinement are often isolated because of actions that challenge dominant perspectives of femininity. Because women of color are often seen as possessing these non-feminine qualities already, they are more susceptible to being put into solitary confinement because of this kind of behavior. Black women are often perceived as “aggressive and recalcitrant,” Latina women are thought to be “loud and belligerent, sexually aggressive, or…unable to speak English,” and Native American women are seen as “backward, savage, and/or primitive.” Because of these preconceptions, women of color are thought to deviate strongly from the feminine ideal, which can be grounds for putting them in solitary confinement.

Representations of crime in popular media serve to perpetuate racial stereotypes as well. Offenders of color, including women, are often portrayed as violent, hypersexual, or drug-addicted. While this is true of women of color in the general prison population as well as those held in solitary confinement, there is a particularly strong culture of fear that is built up around segregation units and the prisoners who are held there. Inmates who appear to belong to particular minority groups are often profiled by prison guards as more likely to be dangerous, violent, or involved in a gang, and therefore are moved into isolation; for example, prisoners who speak a language other than English are sometimes targeted as foreign and therefore gang-involved or dangerous.

Transgender inmates in solitary confinement 
Transgender or gender nonconforming people are over represented in prisons, especially transgender people of color. This could be partly due to the fact that they are disproportionately homeless or living in poverty, conditions which more often lead to incarceration, and because they are targeted by the police and perceived as violent or sexually promiscuous (transgender women in particular). These misconceptions can also be used as reasons that guards place transgender inmates in solitary confinement. The issues that cisgender women face in prisons in general and in solitary confinement in particular can be exacerbated for transgender women, and for transgender men as well. For example, transgender inmates are much more likely to be sexually assaulted than their cisgender counterparts.

Allegedly to protect against this kind of thing, transgender offenders are often put into solitary confinement. Transgender women are sometimes put in male prisons and then separated from the general prison population and put in “protective custody,” which functions in the same ways as solitary confinement, and in fact transgender inmates are sometimes put into segregation facilities that have worse conditions than the ones that cisgender inmates are in. This is said to be for their own safety, since most harassment and assault comes from other prisoners. However, this does not prevent the violence perpetrated by prison guards. Further, while transgender women are often put into confinement to keep them from becoming victims of violence, they are sometimes held near inmates who have been put into confinement because of past violent actions, and then experience violence from those inmates.

Being in solitary confinement can have consequences for transgender women's mental and physical health, in particular because transgender people are already more likely to suffer from depression or other mental illness. Prisoners, and especially those in solitary confinement, do not always have access to the necessary medications, and transgender people specifically are often denied access to the hormones that they take.

Transgender inmates in some prisons are able to form communities with each other or with cisgender inmates, and these relationships both help prevent violence and help support those who have experienced it. Studies have been reported in which men have bonded together to prevent a transgender woman in their facility from being sexually assaulted, and to help transgender women get access to medication they needed. These groups sometimes commit violent acts to defend or avenge a friend who has been hurt, as in the case in a New York men's prison when a group of men killed another man who had attacked a young female transgender inmate; however, despite this violence, it is evident that transgender women sometimes form strong and protective bonds with other inmates that are taken away in solitary confinement. In fact, this is sometimes the purpose of segregating inmates.

Despite all this, some transgender women, just like some cisgender women, do in fact request to be put into solitary confinement for their own safety. This is not the norm, however, and most women find it to be a painful and harmful experience.

References 

Forensic psychology
Imprisonment and detention of women in the United States
Prisoners' and ex-prisoners' rights
Women's rights in the United States